Bantayan may refer to:

Bantayan Island, an island in the Philippines which is a part of Cebu province
 Bantayan, Cebu, the largest municipality on the island
 Bantayanon language, a language spoken on the island, closely related to Hiligaynon
 Bantayan Airport (ICAO code: RPSB)
 King Bantayan, a fictional character from the 2005 fantasy film Exodus: Tales from the Enchanted Kingdom
 Bantayan, a civil structure in Morong, Rizal, Philippines

See also
 
 Bentayan (state constituency), Johor, Malaysia